Bjørn "Lillebjørn" Falk Nilsen (born 21 December 1950) is a Norwegian singer-songwriter and folk musician. He was born in Oslo, and is considered by some to be the leading "voice of Oslo", thanks to numerous classic songs about the city from the 1970s and onwards.

He also makes up the Norwegian supergroup Gitarkameratene with Jan Eggum, Halvdan Sivertsen and Øystein Sunde.

In 1987 he received the Fritt Ord Honorary Award.

Nilsen has collaborated with his friend and idol Pete Seeger on numerous occasions. He adapted Pete Seeger's song My Rainbow Race into Norwegian as Barn av regnbuen ("Children of the Rainbow"). Anders Behring Breivik said that he hated that song, and saw it as a symbol of "cultural Marxism" and multiculturalism. In response, on 26 April 2012, over 40,000 Norwegians sang it publicly outside his trial.

Discography

Albums 
with The Young Norwegians
1967: Things on Our Mind
1969: Music

with Ballade!
1978: Ballade! På turné
1980: Ballade! Ekstranummer
2005: Ballade!s samlede (compilation)

with Gitarkameratene
1989: Gitarkameratene
1990: Typisk norsk
2010:  Kanon

with Andy Irvine
2010: Abocurragh [Nilsen plays on one track.]
2021: Live in Telemark

Solo
1971: Tilbake 
1973: Portrett
1974: Haba Haba
1974: Hei fara! Norske folkeviser
1975: Byen med det store hjertet
1979: Oslo 3 
1980: Live at Sioux Falls (USA) 
1980: Ballade! Ekstranummer 
1982: Original Nilsen 
1985: Hilsen Nilsen 
1988: Sanger 
1993: Nære Nilsen

Re-released albums
1995: Haba Haba 
2001: Portrett 
2003: Byen med det store hjertet (Re-release) 
2003: Tilbake (Re-release) 
2003: Portrett (Re-release)

Compilation albums
1978: Lillebjørn Nilsens beste
1984: Lillebjørn Nilsens utvalgte
1986: Tekst og musikk: Lillebjørn Nilsen
1996: 40 spor: Nilsens 40 beste
2010: Stilleste gutt på sovesal 1 (10 CDs and a DVD)

Singles 
with The Young Norwegians
1966: "Plenty Nothingness and Love" / "Det står ein friar uti garde"
1966: "Joys of Love" / "Jug of Punch"
1967: "Vuggevise for André" / "Goodbye to Your Sparkling Blue Eyes"
1968: "Nightingale" / "Grannie" with Kari Svendsen
with Gitarkameratene
1990: "Barn av regnbuen"
Solo
1973: "Barn av regnbuen" / "Alle duene"
1974: "Haba Haba" / "Kirsebærtreet"
1982: "Tanta til Beate"
1988: "Se deg aldri tilbake"
1993: "Fort gjort å glemme" / "Så nære vi var"
1993: "1000 søte damer"
2006: "Oleanna" (with Pete Seeger) (live)

References

External links 

Living people
1950 births
Norwegian singer-songwriters
Norwegian guitarists
Norwegian male guitarists
Norwegian male singers
Norwegian multi-instrumentalists
Spellemannprisen winners
Musicians from Oslo
Grappa Music artists